Xenodorella mira is a species of tephritid or fruit flies in the genus Xenodorella of the family Tephritidae.

Distribution
Namibia.

References

Tephritinae
Insects described in 1967
Diptera of Africa